Malaysian folklore is the folk culture of Malaysia and other indigenous people of the Malay archipelago as expressed in its oral traditions, written manuscripts and local wisdoms. Malaysian folklores were traditionally transmitted orally in the absence of writing systems. Oral tradition thrived among the Malays, but continues to survive among Orang Asli and numerous bornean ethnic groups in Sarawak and Sabah. Nevertheless, Malaysian folklores are closely connected with classical Malay folklore of the region. Even though, Malay folklore tends to have a regional background, with the passing of time, and through the influence of the modern media, large parts of regional Malay folklore have become interwoven with the wider popular Malaysian folklore.

In Malay, the term budaya rakyat is used to describe folklore. According to the Kamus Dewan, budaya rakyat can be interpreted as stories, customs, clothing, behaviour etc that are inherited by a society or a nation. Malaysian folklore takes a heavy influence from Indian tradition, with a number of figures, legends, and creatures being adapted from the pre-Islamic traditions of the Malay archipelago. This Indian influence means that Malaysian folklore generally differs between regions in the country, folklores from west Malaysia have more influence of Indian folklores than east Malaysia. However, many parts of Malay and Malaysian folklore still contain evidence of pre-Islamic past.

Folk tales 
Malaysian folk tales include a vast variety of forms such as myths, legends, fables, etc. The main influences on Malaysian folk tales have been Indian, Javanese and middle eastern folk tales. Many Indian epics have been translated into Malay since ancient time including the Sanskrit epics of Ramayana and Mahabharata, which are the basis of the Malaysian art of Wayang Kulit. Besides, Indian epics, the Javanese epic of Panji has also influenced Malay literature and plays a major part in enriching Malaysian folk tales.

Malaysian folk tales are usually centred around romance between princes and princesses, kings and queens, or heroes and their damsels. Until today, numerous royal courts exist in Malaysia and supplied the basis of many folk stories. For example, folk tales like Puteri Lindungan Bulan and Raja Bersiong have always been associated with the Sultanate of Kedah, and the story of Puteri Limau Purut has been associated with the Sultanate of Perak. Due to the nature of migration in the region, some of the popular Malaysian folk tales may also arrived from other part of Malay archipelago.

Folk tales 
These folk tales are often told by story tellers called penglipur lara, which defined by Kamus Dewan as people who comfort the sad heart by telling folk tales with elements of humour, usually interspersed with pantun, syair, seloka etc. There are a few penglipur lara that exist today, often farmers or villagers in rural Malaysia. Different form of story tellers exists throughout Malaysia – Awang Batil or Awang Belanga in Perlis; Mak Yong, Siamese Menora, Tok Selampit, Wayang Kulit Kelantan in Kelantan; Hamdolok and Javanese Wayang Kulit Purwo in Johor; Minangkabau Randai and Tukang Kaba in Negeri Sembilan, Jikey, Mek Mulung and Wayang Kulit Gedek in Kedah; Bangsawan in Melaka and Penang.

Among the popular Malaysian folk tales are as follows:

Besides popular Malaysian folk tales mentioned above, the exclusive stories of Mak Yong are considered as the most authentic form of Malay folk tales. Some of those obtained from outside the Malay-Thai region have now died out elsewhere such as Anak Raja Gondang, a story originally from the Jataka tales but now almost unknown in India.

Twelve Mak Yong stories that are considered complete, original and of sufficient artistic value are:

Folk comics 
Malay folk comics are also part of Malaysian folk tales and usually spread orally, even after it is written it still retains its oral properties.

Among the popular Malay folk comics are as follows: 
Abu Nawas
Lebai Malang
Mahasyodhak
Mat Jenin
Musang Berjanggut
Pak Belalang
Pak Kadok
Pak Pandir
Si Luncai

Animal folk tales 

Malaysian animal folk tales are often used to explain certain natural phenomena or moral lessons. The animals in these stories usually possess the ability to speak and think like humans. In Malaysian animal folk tales, the Kancil usually portray as the main character with other animals in the forest as supporting characters. In Malay culture, Kancil is regarded with the highest esteem due to its ability to overcome obstacles and defeat adversaries despite of its rather small appearance. Kancil also appears in the state herald of Melaka and even plays a part in the legend of the founding of Melaka.

Among the Malaysian Kancil stories manuscripts are as follows:
Hikayat Sang Kancil
Pelanduk dengan Anak Memerang
Hikayat Pelanduk Jenaka

Among the popular Kancil stories are as follows:
Sang Kancil Berkawan dengan Monyet
Sang Kancil dengan Buaya
Sang Kancil dengan Gajah
Sang Kancil dengan Gergasi
Sang Kancil dengan Harimau Tua
Sang Kancil dengan Landak
Sang Kancil dengan Monyet
Sang Kancil dengan Perigi Buta
Sang Kancil dengan Tali Pinggang Hikmat
Sang Kancil digigit Buaya
Sang Kancil Menipu Harimau
Sang Kancil Menolong Kerbau

Folk music

Folk music 
Every states in Malaysia employ different versions of oral traditions but the most popular is in the form of folk-singing or lagu rakyat. For example, Ghazal Melayu can be heard in all over Malaysia but it is most associated with Johor district of Muar. In Ghazal Melayu, poets and singers vocalize pantun or syair to the middle eastern and Indian-inspired music called Ghazal Melayu. This form of folk-singing is also performs at weddings and cultural festivals. In Melaka, Dondang Sayang, a Malaccan love ballad, is perform by Malays and the Malay-speaking Peranakan communities, with pantun usually themed around love, life, and marriage. This variety of genres in Malaysian folk music reflects the cultural groups within Malaysian society; Malay, Chinese, Indian, Dayak, Kadazandusun, Bajau, Orang Asli, Melanau, Kristang, Siamese and others.

Different form of folk music can be heard throughout Malaysia – Negeri Sembilan with its Minangkabau Bongai and Tumbuk Kalang; Kelantan with its Dikir Barat and Rebana Ubi; Sabah with their Kulintangan and Bajau Isun-Isun and Kadazandusun Murut Sompoton; Sarawak with their Bermukun, Iban Engkromong and Orang Ulu Sape; Perak with its Belotah and Rebana Perak; Penang with its unique Boria and Ghazal Parti; Selangor with its Javanese Cempuling and Keroncong; Terengganu with its middle eastern inspired Rodat and Kertuk Ulu.

Within each of these folk-singing forms, messages and stories are told, handing down of local wisdom from one generation to another in the form of poetry which may include any of these:
 Pantun – Malay poem that usually consists of four lines in each stanza. The first two lines are hints and the rest contains meaning.
 Syair – Malay poem that usually consists of four lines with the same sound at the end of each stanza.
 Gurindam – pantun that consists of two lines that contain advice or teaching.
 Seloka – Malay poem that contains teachings, satire, or humour.
 Nazam – Malay poem (similar to syair) consisting of twelve lines in each stanza.
 Sajak – Modern Malay poem (different from pantun or syair) composed in beautiful language to express thoughts, feelings, or experiences.
 Mantera - Malay poem that when read can cause supernatural powers (to cure diseases etc.)
 Teromba - Malay poem that contains teachings of Malay customs and traditions in Negeri Sembilan.

Malaysian folk music has also provide inspiration for Malaysian cultural practitioner for centuries. Folk musics, which were originally accompanied by pantun, syair or gurindam, provided inspiration for dance and other styles of performing arts.

Names of traditional Malay songs are the following:

The existence of pre-Islamic beliefs can be traced in traditional Malay songs due to the number of "Kualas", "Hulus", "Gunungs" and "Seris" mentioned in the lyrics and titles. Geographically, many names in the classical pantun and names of the songs are mainly "southern" Malaysia. Some of these melodies were later adopted into other popular folk music genres such as asli, inang or joget.

Folk songs 
Malaysian folklore includes a considerable collection of folksongs. However, several of these folksongs might have been originated from other parts of the Malay archipelago. Many of these songs are in the form of stories weaved into poetry or simple rhyme. These folksongs are often integrated with moral values and some may also include stories of talking animals such as Bangau Oh Bangau and Tanya Sama Pokok.

Among the popular Malaysian children folksongs are as follows:

Among the popular Malaysian regional folksongs are as follows:

Folk epics

Epic hikayat 

Hikayat is a form of Malay literature, which tell the romanticised adventures of Malay heroes, or royal chronicles. The stories though based on historical events, are often involving mythological figures in a setting usually engaging the role of protagonists and antagonists. Often in Malay epics, the child would be born with a weapon or a magical creatures. Many of these hikayat were written in classical Malay using Jawi script from around the 15th century onward.
Among the popular Malay folk hikayat are as follows:

Some of these epic stories were also believed to be an actual historical events that took place in the Malay archipelago. For example,
Anggun Cik Tunggal is set in Tiku-Pariaman
Malim Deman – set in Muar
Hang Tuah – set in Melaka
Benua Tua – a village located in Perak
Lindungan Bulan – an alternative name for Kedah
Nyiur Gading – an alternative name for Melaka
Serendah Sekebun Bunga – an alternative name for Kelantan

Among the popular supporting characters in Malay epics are as follows:
Nenek Kebayan
Si Kembang Cina
Bujang Selamat

Epic syair 

Syair is a form of Malay literature, that is made up of long narrative poems composed of four-line stanzas with the same end rhyme. The syair can be a narrative poem, a didactic poem, a poem used to convey ideas on religion or philosophy, or even one to describe a historical event. Many of these syair were written in Jawi classical Malay.

Among the popular Malay folk syair that in form of hikayat are as follows:

Epic creatures 

Malaysians have always taken great interest in stories of ghosts and mythical creatures. Due to the animistic root of Malaysian folk lores, these ghosts are seen as sharing the plane of existence with humans and are not always considered evil. However, when the delicate line that separates the boundaries of existence is crossed, or a transgression of living spaces occurs, a conflict ensues that may result in disturbances such as possessions. In Malay, the term hantu is used to describe demon, ghost or ghoul and similar to the Japanese Yōkai. Malay folk stories also adopted elements from the Islamic world, of middle eastern and Persian origin, which are somewhat differ from what Malays now refer to as angels or demons.

Among the popular ghost or mythical creatures in Malay folk lores are as follows:

Folk medicine

Folk medicine 
Malaysia is home to one of the world's oldest rainforests, rich in biodiversity with a great variety of plant species. With this biodiversity, a traditional medicine called ramuan is made from natural materials, such as roots, bark, flowers, seeds, leaves and fruits found in the forest, creating pleasing or healthful effects in the preparation of food and herbal medicines. In a broader context, the term ramuan is interchangeable with the concept of “mixture”. However, it further encompasses the sense of ingredient harmonizations; unity and integration of local ingredients.

Kitab Tib is a medical manuscripts written in classical Malay is the basis of written Malay folk medicine. It refers to all medical manuscripts that usually discusses how to treat various diseases using materials from trees and plants mixed with spice ingredients, including constipation, menstruation and rheumatism. The use of prayer is also sometimes included in these manuscripts.

Folk healing 
Besides, written manuscript, Main Puteri, a traditional methods of healing in Kelantan has existed since long ago among the Malay community in the state. It is difficult to distinguish between the aspects of "performing arts" and "medical ritual" in Main Puteri because there is a close relationship between these two elements. From the point of view of performance there are interesting elements in this art, combines the elements of acting, singing, dance and music; in addition to a combination of Islamic, magical and ritual elements. Tok Teri, the group leader, also acts as an intermediary to connect the patient with the Angin or Semangat. During this ritual, Tok Teri will be changing character; being cruel and fierce, senile old, disabled youth, nasal-voiced and various other characters to describe the pain borne by the patient.

Different form of folk-healing ritual can be performed throughout Malaysia – Sabah with its Bajau Berasik and Murut Magunatip; Sarawak with its Melanau Dakan and Iban Sugi Sakit; Terengganu with its Saba.

See also
Malaysian culture
Malaysian folk religion
Malay folklore

References

 01
Malaysian culture
.F
Malaysia